Dictyospermum is a genus of monocotyledonous flowering plants in the family Commelinaceae, first described in 1853. It is native to Tropical Asia. They have only three fertile stamens, middle one inserted opposite petal.

 Species
 Dictyospermum conspicuum (Blume) Hassk. - from Southern China to Southeast Asia
 Dictyospermum humile Faden - New Guinea
 Dictyospermum montanum Benth. - India + Sri Lanka 
 Dictyospermum ovalifolium Benth. - India
 Dictyospermum ovatum Benth. - from India to Southeast Asia

References

Commelinaceae
Commelinales genera